The Angry Beavers is an American animated television series created by Mitch Schauer for Nickelodeon. The series revolves around Norbert and Daggett Beaver, two young beaver brothers who have moved out of their parents' home to become bachelors in the forest near the fictional Wayouttatown, Oregon. The show premiered in the United States on April 19, 1997, and ended on May 26, 2001. The series has also appeared in syndication on Nickelodeon Canada. The complete series has also been released on DVD in Region 1 by Shout! Factory.

Characters

The Angry Beavers

Norbert Foster "Norb" Beaver (voiced by Mitchell Whitfield in the pilot, Nick Bakay in the series) is Daggett's older brother by four minutes. Articulate and well-read, Norbert is a highly opinionated beaver who acts as the voice of reason and straight man to his younger brother's insane ideas. He is very lazy and patronizing towards Daggett. He can be quite selfish at times, and tends to bully, insult, and take advantage of his brother, which usually backfires.
Daggett Doofus "Dag" Beaver (voiced by Richard Steven Horvitz) is the younger brother of Norbert by four minutes. Energetic and childish, Daggett has a habit of over-the-top and sensitive emotions, as well as a self-defence mechanism of name-calling. He shares with his brother a typical brotherly love-hate relationship, helping and abusing his elder sibling as his mood requires. He has a telephone in the likeness of Bullwinkle J. Moose from Rocky and Bullwinkle.

Supporting and recurring characters
Stump is a giant sequoia stump who is a close friend of Norbert and Daggett. He frequents many of the beavers' social events, forming an integral part of their inner friendship circle. When Dagget first met Stump, he was jealous of him but Stump brought Norbert and Dagget closer together. In "Stump Looks for His Roots", he journeys off in search of his real family. Norbert and Dagget almost ate Stump while they were in a cave. Stump is apparently alive, although he is never seen doing anything on screen, and he does not talk, at least out loud.
Treeflower (voiced by Cynthia Mann) is Norbert's love interest who is a hippie beaver with many jobs outside the forest. Treeflower first met Norbert in "Bummer of Love," but her first appearance was in an earlier episode titled "Long in the Teeth" which takes place after they first met. She once dated Truckee the Shrew, but since he only cares about his truck they broke up and her and Norbert have had romantic feelings for each other again ever since. Treeflower was also Muscular Beaver's sidekick, Goody Good Gal. Her careers include elevator songwriter, championship snowboarder, superhero and firefighter. As revealed by series creator Mitch Schauer, she and Norbert are in fact boyfriend and girlfriend.
Bing (voiced by Victor Wilson) is an annoying talkative lizard who hangs out with Norbert and Dagget. Bing went through a breakup in one episode. Norbert and Daggett also fought over him because he told all the other creatures that they were both constantly ditching him. Bing has a tendency to talk fast. Bing is able to camouflage himself to blend with his surroundings, suggesting that he is a chameleon. Bing has a girlfriend named Wanda.
Barry Bear (voiced by John Garry) is Norbert and Daggett's disco/funk-loving grizzly bear best friend, whose voice and personality is modeled on Barry White. Barry is a vegetarian despite being a bear. He once made a disco album after everybody got sick of Beaver Fever. In "Un-Barry-Able, Barry felt awkward around Norbert because he was acting like Daggett. In "Finger Lickin' Goofs," the beavers thought Barry was going to eat them (a lie that Bill Licking made up).
Truckee (voiced by Mark Klastorin in most appearances, Mitch Schauer in "Dag's List") is a truck-loving shrew, who Daggett hates immensely. He drives a big truck around called "Big Renee". Truckee once worked together with Daggett when a "volnado" (a combination of a tornado and volcano) threatened to destroy his dam. Though they escaped, he stole all of Norbert's stuff (he could not take Daggett's stuff because Daggett had it all nailed down). He is very volatile about the size of his ears.
Big Rabbit (voiced by Scott Weil in most appearances, Richard Steven Horvitz in "Omega Beaver") is Norbert and Daggett's toughest friend. It is revealed that he sent a threatening note to them and set up a bodyguard business so they would be his friend. Norb and Dag eventually meet his family.
Wolffe D. Wolf (voiced by Wally Wingert) is an easy going gray wolf who is a close friend of Norbert and Daggett and is the opposite of the typical wolfish stereotype.
Chelsea Beaver (voiced by Chelsea Schauer) is one of Norbert and Daggett's younger sisters and a female doppelgänger of Daggett. Chelsea is also manic and naive like Dagget.
Stacy Beaver (voiced by Stacy Schauer) is another of Norbert and Daggett's younger sisters and a female doppelgänger of the former. Stacy is also level-headed and sardonic like Norbert.
Leonard Beaver (voiced by Tim Thomerson in most appearances, Lorin Dreyfuss in "If You In-Sisters") is the lazy and scruffy father of Norbert, Daggett, Chelsea, and Stacy. He once stayed with Norbert and Daggett because their mother and sisters left to visit their grandmother. Leonard has a strange condition called the "poo spot" (when someone presses it, it makes a flatulence noise). He also encourages Dag to slap his tail even though beavers are only supposed to use the slap for emergencies.
Mrs. Beaver (voiced by Sheryl Bernstein in her cameo appearance "Up All Night", Linda Phillips in "Kandid Kreatures", Marcia Wallace in "If You In-Sisters", Ruth Buzzi in “The Mom from U.N.C.L.E.”) is Norbert, Dagget, Chelsea, and Stacy's mother and Leonard's wife. She is a secret agent as well as a housewife.
High Princess (voiced by Beverly Garland) is the leader of the female raccoon tribe and the beavers' nemesis who appears twice in the series. During her first appearance, she mistakes Daggett for a god because he had a knot hole on his head. However, Norbert and Daggett end up destroying the knot hole. She gets even with the beavers by having her tribe literally cooking their dam over an open flame. During her second appearance, it was revealed that she was the one pranking Norb and Dag.
Bill Licking (voiced by Gregg Berger) is a wig-wearing wildlife television host and Norbert and Daggett's influence and sometimes rival. He had a contract with the beavers to make them look good but instead he humiliated them. The beavers got even with him by attacking him on his own show.
Laverta Lutz (voiced by Kate Donahue) is a big, slovenly magical woman with a Southern accent who works in the bowing alley as a maintenance worker who always bumps into Daggett for making wishes for him. She helped Dag bowl better, helped him win arguments against Norb and transported him to a world where Norb was an only child. 
El Grapadura (voiced by Timothy Borquez in most appearances, Luke Torres in "Kandid Creatures", Joe Lala in some episodes) is the Mexican Luchador, Norbert and Daggett's favorite wrestling hero. His name translates in English as The Stapler.
Oxnard Montalvo (voiced by Tom Kane) is Norbert and Daggett's favorite B movie actor. Norbert and Daggett once helped him save the world from the monsters in his movies because they brought them to life by remembering his films. Scientist #1 managed to make him do his movies in color. Unlike most humans in the series, Oxnard, along with Toluca and Dr. Cowtiki, are drawn more realistically.
Toluca Lake (voiced by Adrienne Barbeau in most appearances, Sheryl Bernstein in “Up All Night”) is an actress who plays as the damsel in distress in Oxnard's B-Movies. 
Dr. Cowtiki (voiced by William Schallert) is the other actor who played as the scientist in the B-Movies with Oxnard and Toluca.
Scientist #1 (voiced by Edward Winter) is a mad scientist who laughs in an evil way as he does his job for science and is the main antagonist of the series and archenemy of Norbert and Daggett. Scientist #1 always mistakes the beavers for pointy weasels. His chest hair is literally in the shape of a one and in one episode, it is revealed that he does not have eyes underneath his glasses. He once accidentally transformed himself into a beaver and built a futuristic society.

Production

Conception and development
The Angry Beavers was the brainchild of Mitch Schauer, and was co-developed by Keith Kaczorek. Prior to the series, Schauer was originally an assistant storyboard artist for other Nickelodeon shows, such as The Ren & Stimpy Show, Rocko's Modern Life, and Hey Arnold!. Schauer also storyboarded 8 episodes of the 1992 Addams Family television series. During his time as producer of the Warner Bros. animated series Freakazoid! in 1995, Gunther-Wahl Productions Inc. (Schauer's employer at the time) requested three ideas for animated series, as the studio had the opportunity to pitch a show to Nickelodeon. One of the three ideas that Schauer presented was an early concept for The Angry Beavers. Schauer wasn't even present for the pitch meeting, his ideas being pitched for him by the production company instead. Of the three ideas, network producer Mary Harrington was intrigued by the Beavers. The Angry Beavers was inspired from Schauer's early years in Oklahoma when he was homeless and often spotted beavers in a nearby river. The initial concept of the show centered on two bad-tempered, politically incorrect beavers that hated anything that was a fad, cause, or just popular in the media. "I tend to develop things that are counterculture", stated Schauer. "I like to buck whatever is popular at the time or considered society's way of doing things, because you get more interest when you stand outside the box". Schauer was against making the beavers cute, as a response to many of the "soft, safe" character designs at the time. He also cited cartoons such as The Pink Panther, The Flintstones, and Rocky and Bullwinkle as primary influences for the show.

During production of the series, Schauer and the crew began to learn more about real world beavers and implemented their traits into the show's storylines, considering himself to have become a "beaver expert" by the end of its run. Traits adapted into the show include their endlessly growing incisors, tail slapping, and scent glands. During his time at Nickelodeon, Schauer gifted Harrington a personally signed log that was bitten by a beaver, though he later admitted in 2017 that he bit it himself.

Richard Steven Horvitz and Nick Bakay were chosen as voice actors for main beavers Daggett and Norbert, respectively. Gunther-Wahl held auditions for over 300 different actors, but Schauer settled on the two because they embodied the two beavers' characters perfectly, also being impressed by their chemistry upon being introduced to one another. He recalled the two frequently going off-script while recording, which he encouraged, considering their improvisation leading to some of the series' best moments. Schauer was influenced by classic Hollywood director Howard Hawks for the show's ad-libbing and overlapping of dialogue.

Challenges, censorship, and "Bye Bye Beavers"
There was often tension between Schauer and Nickelodeon, with the channel imposing seemingly arbitrary restrictions on the show's content. An example includes season one's "Go Beavers" where they rejected a scene that would have featured a blimp crashing into an audience of people, while a scene in the same episode featuring out of control zambonis that wipe into and supposedly kill a crowd of people didn't meet any objections. Most infamously, the words "Shut up!" were initially censored in the 1998 episode "Alley Oops". Writer Micah Wright attributed this to then-Nickelodeon president Herb Scannell, quoting him as saying: "I don't like it when children say 'Shut up,' so if we never say it on our show, children will never say it in the real world". Wright further claimed that Scannell "would make these sweeping pronouncements about the way the world worked, and the way that kids thought, and what he wanted the world to look like", also imposing a "no-drag" policy, which forbade characters dressing in non-gender conforming clothing in order to prevent "sexual confusion" amongst the show's younger viewers. Nick Bakay, voice of Norbert, also expressed displeasure with the network, dubbing them "not very artist-friendly".

While the show was popular and was renewed for four seasons, Schauer continued to push against the network's Standards and Practices division. "We were significantly over budget, behind schedule, and had generally worn out our welcome [with the network]" recalled series co-developer Keith Kaczorek. As the series faced cancellation, the crew devised a final episode, "Bye Bye Beavers", where the Beavers are informed by mail that their show is cancelled. During the episode, they openly criticize the network for cancelling shows and syndication, wrestle with their existence as cartoon characters, and even referencing the infamous censoring of the words "shut up". The episode was set to end with both beavers being "killed off" and sent to cartoon heaven. The episode was expected to be fully produced, as Nickelodeon initially approved the premise of the episode, but as production went on they reverted their decision. Production was halted as the episode went against the network's policies of forbidding any reference to a show ending or characters dying. As a result, the episode only exists in the form of leaked storyboards and audio (the latter being released by Richard Steven Horvitz, voice of Daggett, in 2006). Margie Cohn, then-executive vice president of the network's original programming, admitted that the episode's script was "beautifully crafted, funny, and clever", but ultimately the network was against the idea of killing off characters that its audience had grown to love.

Schauer would sometimes poke fun at the network's demands. The episode "The Legend of Kid Friendly" (where the Beavers face off against a cowboy literally named "Kid Friendly") was created as a response to broadcast standards notes received from the network. "One of the most repeated notes was 'make sure it's kid-friendly', so it seemed natural to write a story around the comment", said Schauer. Weapons featured on the show typically received feedback requesting them be redesigned to be "larger and more colorful", to which the crew would happily oblige. Despite the crew typically being at odds with network censorship, Schauer considers the experience working with Nickelodeon a positive one.

The Angry Beavers was the final (and most notable) animated series produced by Gunther-Wahl Productions Inc., which was later shut down in 2001, after the series ended its run.

Episodes

Reception 
The Angry Beavers received positive reviews from critics. In a positive review, Harlene Ellin of the Chicago Tribune praised the show for its humor, visuals, cultural references, and nonsensical plots, writing "Although the story lines can be pure silliness, the characters are well-developed and likable, whether they're fighting each other or working together. But most of all, [this show is] downright funny. And dam it, 'The Angry Beavers' is definitely that." Hollywood.com considered the show to be "truly the most clever and mature cartoon to air on Nickelodeon", praising its "whip-smart" dialogue and cultural references, considering it underappreciated when compared to Nickelodeon's other classic cartoons. Spencer Coriarty of Screen Rant wrote, "Together the two seem to get involved in every odd occurrence conceivable [...] the animation here is rather stunning, as is the offbeat writing which includes throwbacks to 1950s sci-fi. Creative as it is sporadic, The Angry Beavers is chaotic, nutty, whacky, and fun in the best possible way." Olivia Armstrong of Decider praised the show for appealing to older audiences, saying "Not only did you love to watch the adventures of Norbert and Daggett Beaver, but so did your parents and older siblings, without pestering you to hand over the remote. Perhaps it was the pure slapstick comedy or their bizarre, sometimes inappropriate friends and neighbors, but those beavers will go down in history as the funniest dam dwellers to ever exist and the oddest way to bring your family together." Andrea Graham of Common Sense Media spoke positively of the series, writing "While the series' humor may seem sophomoric, it's actually quite funny."

Awards and nominations

Broadcast history

Asia
 Nickelodeon Japan (1998–2009)
 Tokyo Broadcasting System (1998–2002)
 Spacetoon (2002–present)
 Zarok TV (2016–present)
 Studio 23

Europe
 CITV (1997–2001)
 Nickelodeon UK (1997–2002)
 The Children's Channel (1997–1998)
 Nicktoons UK (2002–2010)
 Spacetoon English (2005–2011)

Oceania
 Nickelodeon Australia
 TV3

North America
 Nickelodeon (April 19, 1997 – November 22, 2007; August 6, 2010 – May 25, 2013)
 YTV (1997–2003)
 Nicktoons (May 1, 2002 – October 31, 2007; 2010)
 Nickelodeon Canada (November 2, 2009 – January 12, 2017)
 NickRewind (2011; 2013; October 2015 – February 2017; April 19, 2017; August 19, 2017; February 27, 2021-December 6, 2021)

Home media
Nickelodeon and Amazon.com teamed up to release The Angry Beavers and other Nick shows on manufacture-on-demand DVD-R discs available exclusively through Amazon's CreateSpace arm. 

The Angry Beavers sets, among others, were discontinued when Nick began releasing traditional DVDs of many of their series in association with Shout! Factory. The first DVD release for Angry Beavers was the Seasons 1 and 2 4-disc set on August 23, 2011. Season 3: Part 1 was released in a 2-disc set on February 28, 2012. Season 3: Part 2 was released in a 2-disc set on August 14, 2012. Season 4 (The Final Season) was released in a 2-disc set on February 4, 2014.

On July 30, 2013, Shout! Factory released the complete series set in Region 1.

In Australia, The Angry Beavers has been released on DVD by Viacom International Inc. and distributed by Beyond Home Entertainment.

Video games
Though the series has no official video games, The Angry Beavers appeared in Nicktoons Racing for PlayStation, Game Boy Advance, PC, Game Boy Color, and Arcade, as playable characters. Norbert and Daggett had a cameo as a trophies in Nicktoons: Attack of the Toybots and in Nicktoons MLB as well.

References

External links
 
 

1990s American animated television series
1990s American children's comedy television series
1990s Nickelodeon original programming
1997 American television series debuts
2000s American animated television series
2000s American children's comedy television series
2000s Nickelodeon original programming
2001 American television series endings
American children's animated comedy television series
Annie Award winners
Animated television series about brothers
Animated television series about mammals
English-language television shows
Fictional beavers
Nicktoons
Television series by Rough Draft Studios
Television series created by Mitch Schauer
Television shows set in Oregon